Qinghe Reservoir() Large Type II reservoir in Qinghe District, Tieling, Liaoning, China.

References 

Dams in China
Dams completed in 1958
Qinghe District, Tieling
Buildings and structures in Liaoning
Buildings and structures in Tieling